The 2004 Armenian Premier League season was the thirteenth since its establishment. It was contested by 8 teams, and Pyunik FC won the championship. No team was relegated this season, because the Football Federation of Armenia decided to increase the number of teams in the premier league from 8 to 9 for the 2005 season.

Overview
 Kilikia FC are promoted.
 Dinamo-2000 change their name to Dinamo-Zenit Yerevan.
 Lernagorts Kapan changed their name to Lernagorts-Ararat Kapan.

League standings

Results

First half of season

Second half of season

See also
 2004 in Armenian football
 2004 Armenian First League
 2004 Armenian Cup

References
 Armenia - List of final tables (RSSSF)

Armenian Premier League seasons
1
Armenia
Armenia